Sir Shakeel Ahmed Qureshi  is a British physician who is Consultant Paediatric Cardiologist at Guy's and St Thomas' NHS Foundation Trust. He is Chair of the Medical Board of the Charity Chain of Hope.

Early life and education 
Qureshi was born in Pakistan, and migrated to the United Kingdom with his father. He was a medical student at the University of Manchester, and completed his training at the Royal Liverpool University Hospital.

Research and career 
Qureshi worked on interventions for Congenital Heart Disease. In the late eighties he developed the Tyshak balloon, a device to dilate blood vessels in children, which is widely used in such procedures.

In 2004, Qureshi was awarded the Sitara-i-Imtiaz for his efforts to develop paediatric cardiology in Pakistan. He has said that he experienced racism throughout his medical career. He served as Present of the Association of European Paediatric Cardiologists until 2013.

Qureshi is a member of the board of directors at Chain of Hope. He started working with the charity whilst treating children at Evelina London Children's Hospital. He represented them on medical missions in Uganda and Ethiopia.

Qureshi was knighted in the 2022 New Year Honours for services to paediatric cardiology and charity.

Selected publications

References 

British paediatricians
Pediatric cardiologists
British physicians of Pakistani descent
Alumni of the University of Manchester
Knights Bachelor
Living people
Year of birth missing (living people)
Pakistani emigrants to the United Kingdom
Naturalised citizens of the United Kingdom
British cardiologists